San Lorenzo Zinacantán is a town in the southern part of the Central Chiapas highlands in the Mexican state of Zinacantán Municipality, Chiapas. 99.1% of its population is Tzotzil Maya, an indigenous people with linguistic and cultural ties to other highland Maya peoples.

Zinacantán literally means "land of bats" and comes from the Nahuatl language. People in Zinacantán speak Tzotzil (a Mayan language) and they call their own land "Sots'leb", that is, "land of bats" in their own language.

Population
As of 2010, the municipality had a total population of 36,489.

As of 2010, the town of Zinacantán had a population of 3,876. Other than the town of Zinacantán, the municipality had 60 localities, the largest of which (with 2010 populations in parentheses) were: Navenchauc (4,625), Pasté (3,771), classified as urban, and Nachig (3,260), Apas (1,485), Patosil (1,452), Zequentic (1,201), and Bochojbo Alto (1,088), classified as rural.

Traditional charges and feasts

Many feasts are celebrated during the year. In every feast men are in charge of the celebration—they are: martomoetik, alperesetik, and moletik. The first two of these three names are loan words from the Spanish mayordomos and alférez, respectively. They have to pay whatever is needed in order to celebrate the feasts. These three kinds of cargos (“charges”) are in fact a hierarchy. They constitute an ascending scale in the same order as they are described below. One can never become one of the moletik if he hasn't been a martomo first and then an alperes. These charges are just for men, although their wives have important roles in their husbands' charges. There are twelve martomoetik, twelve alperesetik and six moletik, who are chosen by the inhabitants of Zinacantan every year. Each one has a different feast assigned to him during the year, although they each have to assist in every feast throughout the year.

The martomoetik are those in charge to buy whatever is needed for the feast within the church (flowers, candles, pine leaves, etc.). The alperesetik are those who buy and prepare everything needed for the feast outside the church: fireworks, kameró (which is a sort of “bomb” or explosive that they use at certain moments of the feast in order to emphasize its importance), etc. The moletik are the elders who are in charge of teaching the younger chargers how to organize the feast. Three days before of the very day of the feast they begin to celebrate by wearing their traditional clothes and performing the corresponding traditional rites.

The patron saint of Zinacantán is San Lorenzo (Saint Lawrence), whose feast day is 10 August.  This traditional feast lasts four days (8–10 August). The feast of Saint Sebastian, 20 January, is also important in Zinacantan. In fact, Saint Sebastian's feast lasts from 18 to 22 January. There are also many other feasts which are less important, including Epiphany on 6 January, Our Lady of the Candelaria on 2 February, Ash Wednesday, Holy Week, Pentecost, Saint Dominic on 4 August, Saint Matthiew on 22 September, and Christmas.

History

In pre-Columbian times before the conquerors' arrival, Zinacantán already had strong links with the Aztecs in the Central Zone of Mexico. Zinacantecans exchanged their products (especially salt, but by the 19th century also cacao, tobacco, and coffee) with Aztec traders.

The first missionaries who came to evangelize the native inhabitants in Zinacantán were the Dominican Friars. They settled in Zinacantan in the 16th century and built a wooden chapel to begin their mission. These missionaries left Zinacantán before they were expelled from Mexico by the government in the 17th century. They resumed their pastoral work in Zinacantan in 1976.

An important development in Zinacantán was the construction of the Pan American Highway, which significantly improved the mobility and prosperity of the Zinacanteco population, as it enabled them to easily transport goods to market such as maize and flowers.

Climate
Köppen-Geiger climate classification system classifies its climate as subtropical highland (Cfb).

References

''This article draws upon information contained in the Spanish-language Wikipedia article, :es:Zinacantán.
  Zinacantán at Enciclopedia de los Municipios de México:

External links
 Zinacantán Tzotzil Vocabulary List (from the World Loanword Database)

Municipalities of Chiapas